The 2017–18 New York Knicks season was the 72nd season of the franchise in the National Basketball Association (NBA).

On June 28, 2017, the Knicks' president of basketball operations Phil Jackson has mutually agreed to leave the team. On July 14, 2017, the Knicks named Scott Perry to become the team's general manager after promoting Steve Mills to become the team's president of basketball operations. However, the Knicks would have to give up a 2019 second round pick and cash considerations to acquire him. 

For the first time since 2011, Carmelo Anthony was not on the roster, as he was traded to the Oklahoma City Thunder in the offseason, before training camp began, in exchange for Enes Kanter, Doug McDermott, and a 2018 second round draft pick.

On February 6, 2018 Kristaps Porzingis suffered a torn ACL, ending his season for the Knicks.

On April 12, 2018, the Knicks fired Jeff Hornacek and Kurt Rambis.

Draft

As one of the last things former team president Phil Jackson would do for the Knicks, he looked to oversee the prospects the team had for the New York Knicks. One of the more dramatic points of the team's draft prowess came nights before the draft began, where Jackson said he was looking to offer star player Kristaps Porziņģis (who was feeling very discouraged about the direction the team was taking around this time) to either the Phoenix Suns or Boston Celtics in exchange for the opportunity to also draft coveted small forward Josh Jackson. Rumors of Jackson also trying to obtain point guard Lonzo Ball from the Los Angeles Lakers would also crop up months after the draft concluded. However, after the Knicks ultimately failed to gain another draft pick to join their own first round selection, they would stick around with Kristaps and the three selections they still had back when their previous season concluded. For their only first round pick, the Knicks would select the French/Belgian point guard Frank Ntilikina, who last played for the SIG Strasbourg in France's LNB Pro A. As for their two-second round draft picks (the first being acquired from Chicago and the second from Houston), New York would use them on senior shooting guard Damyean Dotson from the University of Houston and Serbian point guard Ognjen Jaramaz from the Mega Leks. After the failed attempt to trade their star center, Jackson would ultimately be terminated from his position on June 28, 2017.

Roster

<noinclude>

Standings

Division

Conference

Game log

Preseason 

|- style="background:#ffcccc
| 1
| October 3
| Brooklyn
| 
| Hardaway Jr., Kanter (17)
| Beasley, Hernangomez (10)
| Ramon Sessions (5)
| Madison Square Garden14,981
| 0–1
|- style="background:#ffcccc
| 2
| October 6
| @ Washington
| 
| Enes Kanter (16)
| Michael Beasley (8)
| Jack, Sessions (5)
| Capital One Arena11,899
| 0–2
|- style="background:#ffcccc
| 3
| October 8
| @ Brooklyn
| 
| Willy Hernangomez (17)
| Willy Hernangomez (12)
| Jarrett Jack (5)
| Barclays Center14,161
| 0–3
|- style="background:#ffcccc
| 4
| October 9
| Houston
| 
| Tim Hardaway Jr. (21)
| Enes Kanter (8)
| Baker, Quinn (4)
| Madison Square GardenN/A
| 0–4
|- style="background:#ffcccc
| 5
| October 13
| Washington
| 
| Tim Hardaway Jr. (23)
| Enes Kanter, Kyle O'Quinn (7)
| Ron Baker (5)
| Madison Square Garden17,461
| 0–5

Regular season 

|- style="background:#fcc;"
| 1
| October 19
| @ Oklahoma
| 
| Kristaps Porzingis (31)
| Kristaps Porzingis (12)
| Baker, McDermott (4)
| Chesapeake Energy Arena18,203
| 0–1
|- style="background:#fcc;"
| 2
| October 21
| Detroit
| 
| Kristaps Porzingis (33)
| Enes Kanter (10)
| Baker, Sessions (5)
| Madison Square Garden19,812
| 0–2
|- style="background:#fcc;"
| 3
| October 24
| @ Boston
| 
| Enes Kanter (16)
| Enes Kanter (19)
| Ramon Sessions (7)
| TD Garden18,624
| 0–3　
|- style="background:#cfc;"
| 4
| October 27
| Brooklyn
| 
| Kristaps Porzingis (30)
| Kristaps Porzingis (9)
| Jack, Ntilikina (5)
| Madison Square Garden19,812
| 1–3
|- style="background:#cfc;"
| 5
| October 29
| @ Cleveland
| 
| Tim Hardaway Jr. (34)
| Kanter, Porzingis (12)
| Jarrett Jack (9)
| Quicken Loans Arena20,562
| 2–3
|- style="background:#cfc;"
| 6
| October 30
| Denver
| 
| Kristaps Porzingis (38)
| Enes Kanter (9)
| Jarrett Jack (10)
| Madison Square Garden19,812
| 3–3

|- style="background:#fcc;"
| 7
| November 1
| Houston
| 
| Tim Hardaway Jr. (23)
| Hardaway Jr., Thomas (7)
| Frank Ntilikina (8)
| Madison Square Garden18,320
| 3–4
|- style="background:#cfc;"
| 8
| November 3
| Phoenix
| 
| Kristaps Porzingis (37)
| Enes Kanter (15)
| Jarrett Jack (8)
| Madison Square Garden19,404
| 4–4
|- style="background:#cfc;"
| 9
| November 5
| Indiana
| 
| Kristaps Porzingis (40)
| Enes Kanter (18)
| Frank Ntilikina (7)
| Madison Square Garden17,889
| 5–4
|- style="background:#cfc;"
| 10
| November 7
| Charlotte
| 
| Kristaps Porzingis (28)
| Enes Kanter(6)
| Courtney Lee (9)
| Madison Square Garden18,704
| 6–4
|- style="background:#fcc;"
| 11
| November 8
| @ Orlando
| 
| Tim Hardaway Jr. (26)
| Tim Hardaway Jr. (11)
| Frank Ntilikina (9)
| Amway Center18,500
| 6–5
|- style="background:#cfc;"
| 12
| November 11
| Sacramento
| 
| Kristaps Porzingis (34)
| Enes Kanter (13)
| Jarrett Jack (6)
| Madison Square Garden19,812
| 7–5
|- style="background:#fcc;"
| 13
| November 13
| Cleveland
| 
| Tim Hardaway Jr. (28)
| Enes Kanter (16)
| Hardaway Jr., Jack (5)
| Madison Square Garden19,812
| 7–6
|- style="background:#cfc;"
| 14
| November 15
| Utah
| 
| Tim Hardaway Jr. (26)
| Kristaps Porzingis (8)
| Jarrett Jack (5)
| Madison Square Garden18,695
| 8–6
|- style="background:#fcc;"
| 15
| November 17
| @ Toronto
| 
| Hardaway Jr., Porzingis (13)
| Michael Beasley (7)
| Jarrett Jack (7)
| Air Canada Centre19,800
| 8–7
|- style="background:#cfc;"
| 16
| November 20
| L.A. Clippers
| 
| Kristaps Porzingis (25)
| Enes Kanter (16)
| Jarrett Jack (7)
| Madison Square Garden18,848
| 9–7
|- style="background:#cfc;"
| 17
| November 22
| Toronto
| 
| Tim Hardaway Jr. (38)
| Kristaps Porzingis (12)
| Courtney Lee (7)
| Madison Square Garden19,812
| 10–7
|- style="background:#fcc;"
| 18
| November 24
| @ Atlanta
| 
| Kristaps Porzingis (28)
| Willy Hernangomez (7)
| Jarrett Jack (14)
| Philips Arena14,355
| 10–8
|- style="background:#fcc;"
| 19
| November 25
| @ Houston
| 
| Michael Beasley (30)
| Kyle O'Quinn (15)
| Jarrett Jack (8)
| Toyota Center18,055
| 10–9
|- style="background:#fcc;"
| 20
| November 27
| Portland
| 
| Kristaps Porzingis (22)
| Kyle O'Quinn (11)
| Jack, Quinn (3)
| Madison Square Garden18,409
| 10–10
|- style="background:#cfc;"
| 21
| November 29
| Miami
| 
| Enes Kanter (22)
| Enes Kanter (14)
| Jarrett Jack (7)
| Madison Square Garden17,693
| 11–10

|- style="background:#fcc;"
| 22
| December 3
| Orlando
| 
| Michael Beasley (21)
| Enes Kanter (16)
| Jarrett Jack (7)
| Madison Square Garden19,082
| 11–11
|- style="background:#fcc;"
| 23
| December 4
| @ Indiana
| 
| Willy Hernangomez (14)
| Willy Hernangomez (10)
| Jarrett Jack (5)
| Bankers Life Fieldhouse12,018
| 11–12
|- style="background:#cfc;"
| 24
| December 6
| Memphis
| 
| Courtney Lee (24)
| Enes Kanter (12)
| Jarrett Jack (10)
| Madison Square Garden19,812
| 12–12
|- style="background:#fcc;"
| 25
| December 9
| @ Chicago
| 
| Kristaps Porzingis (22)
| Enes Kanter (11)
| Frank Ntilikina (7)
| United Center20,149
| 12–13
|- style="background:#cfc;"
| 26
| December 10
| Atlanta
| 
| Kristaps Porzingis (30)
| Kristaps Porzingis (8)
| Baker, Jack, O'Quinn (4)
| Madison Square Garden19,189
| 13–13
|- style="background:#cfc;"
| 27
| December 12
| LA Lakers
| 
| Kristaps Porzingis (37)
| Kanter, Porzingis (11)
| Jarrett Jack (10)
| Madison Square Garden19,359
| 14–13
|- style="background:#cfc;"
| 28
| December 14
| @ Brooklyn
| 
| Courtney Lee (27)
| Enes Kanter (9)
| Frank Ntilikina (8)
| Barclays Center17,732
| 15–13
|- style="background:#cfc;"
| 29
| December 16
| Oklahoma City
| 
| Michael Beasley (30)
| Jarrett Jack (8)
| Jarrett Jack (7)
| Madison Square Garden19,812
| 16–13
|- style="background:#fcc;"
| 30
| December 18
| @ Charlotte
| 
| Michael Beasley (23)
| Michael Beasley (9)
| Jarrett Jack (7)
| Spectrum Center15,386
| 16–14
|- style="background:#cfc;"
| 31
| December 21
| Boston
| 
| Michael Beasley (32)
| Michael Beasley (12)
| Courtney Lee (3)
| Madison Square Garden19,812
| 17–14
|- style="background:#fcc;"
| 32
| December 22
| @ Detroit
| 
| Kristaps Porzingis (29)
| Enes Kanter (16)
| Jarrett Jack (6)
| Little Caesars Arena16,922
| 17–15
|- style="background:#fcc;"
| 33
| December 25
| Philadelphia
| 
| Enes Kanter (31)
| Enes Kanter (22)
| Jarrett Jack (7)
| Madison Square Garden19,812
| 17–16
|- style="background:#fcc;"
| 34
| December 27
| @ Chicago
| 
| Kristaps Porzingis (23)
| Enes Kanter (11)
| Jarrett Jack (8)
| United Center21,883
| 17–17
|- style="background:#fcc;"
| 35
| December 28
| @ San Antonio
| 
| Michael Beasley (23)
| Michael Beasley (12)
| Frank Ntilikina (11)
| AT&T Center18,935
| 17–18
|- style="background:#cfc;"
| 36
| December 30
| @ New Orleans
| 
| Kristaps Porzingis (30)
| Enes Kanter (9)
| Jarrett Jack (7)
| Smoothie King Center16,947
| 18–18

|- style="background:#fcc;"
| 37
| January 2
| San Antonio
| 
| Michael Beasley (18)
| Beasley, Porzingis (9)
| Lee, Jack (5)
| Madison Square Garden19,812
| 18–19
|- style="background:#fcc;"
| 38
| January 3
| @ Washington
| 
| Michael Beasley (20)
| Kyle O'Quinn (10)
| Jarrett Jack (4)
| Capital One Arena17,206
| 18–20
|- style="background:#fcc;"
| 39
| January 5
| @ Miami
| 
| Courtney Lee (24)
| Michael Beasley (10)
| Jarrett Jack (5)
| American Airlines Arena19,600
| 18–21
|- style="background:#cfc;"
| 40
| January 7
| @ Dallas
| 
| Kristaps Porzingis (29)
| Enes Kanter (18)
| Jarrett Jack (8)
| American Airlines Center20,171
| 19–21
|- style="background:#fcc;"
| 41
| January 10
| Chicago
| 
| Michael Beasley (26)
| Michael Beasley (12)
| Jarrett Jack (10)
| Madison Square Garden19,812
| 19–22
|- style="background:#fcc;"
| 42
| January 12
| @ Minnesota
| 
| Jarrett Jack (18)
| Enes Kanter (12)
| Jarrett Jack (8)
| Target Center18,978
| 19–23
|- style="background:#fcc;"
| 43
| January 14
| New Orleans
| 
| Hardaway Jr., Porzingis (25)
| Enes Kanter (10)
| Jarrett Jack (8)
| Madison Square Garden19,812
| 19–24
|- style="background:#cfc;"
| 44
| January 15
| @ Brooklyn
| 
| Kristaps Porzingis (26)
| Michael Beasley (10)
| Frank Ntilikina (10)
| Barclays Center17,732
| 20–24
|- style="background:#fcc;"
| 45
| January 17
| @ Memphis
| 
| Kristaps Porzingis (21)
| Kanter, Porzingis (9)
| Jarrett Jack (8)
| FedExForum12,885
| 20–25
|- style="background:#cfc;"
| 46
| January 19
| @ Utah
| 
| Tim Hardaway Jr. (31)
| Enes Kanter (9)
| Jarrett Jack (6)
| Vivint Smart Home Arena18,306
| 21–25
|- style="background:#fcc;"
| 47
| January 21
| @ LA Lakers
| 
| Beasley, Hardaway Jr., Porzingis (17)
| Enes Kanter (14)
| Jarrett Jack (10)
| Staples Center18,997
| 21–26
|- style="background:#fcc;"
| 48
| January 23
| @ Golden State
| 
| Michael Beasley (21)
| Enes Kanter (9)
| Jarrett Jack (6)
| Oracle Arena19,596
| 21–27
|- style="background:#fcc;"
| 49
| January 25
| @ Denver
| 
| Beasley, Porzingis (21)
| Kanter, Porzingis (7)
| Trey Burke (11)
| Pepsi Center15,482
| 21–28
|- style="background:#cfc;"
| 50
| January 26
| @ Phoenix
| 
| Enes Kanter (20)
| Enes Kanter (10)
| Jack, Lee (5)
| Talking Stick Resort Arena17,068
| 22–28
|- style="background:#cfc;"
| 51
| January 30
| Brooklyn
| 
| Kristaps Porzingis (28)
| Enes Kanter (20)
| Kanter, Ntilikina (5)
| Madison Square Garden19,505
| 23–28
|- style="background:#fcc;"
| 52
| January 31
| @ Boston
| 
| Enes Kanter (17)
| Enes Kanter (17)
| Jarrett Jack (4)
| TD Garden18,624
| 23–29

|- style="background:#fcc;"
| 53
| February 2
| @ Milwaukee
| 
| Kanter, Porzingis (17)
| Enes Kanter (18)
| Jarrett Jack (7)
| Bradley Center18,717
| 23–30
|- style="background:#fcc;"
| 54
| February 4
| Atlanta
| 
| Kristaps Porzingis (22)
| Enes Kanter (12)
| Jarrett Jack (4)
| Madison Square Garden19,441
| 23–31
|- style="background:#fcc;"
| 55
| February 6
| Milwaukee
| 
| Enes Kanter (19)
| Enes Kanter (16)
| Tim Hardaway Jr. (4)
| Madison Square Garden19,812
| 23–32
|- style="background:#fcc;"
| 56
| February 8
| @ Toronto
| 
| Michael Beasley (21)
| Luke Kornet (10)
| Jarrett Jack (6)
| Air Canada Centre19,800
| 23–33
|- style="background:#fcc;"
| 57
| February 11
| @ Indiana
| 
| Hardaway Jr., Kanter (17)
| Michael Beasley (13)
| Emmanuel Mudiay (10)
| Bankers Life Fieldhouse17,923
| 23–34
|- style="background:#fcc;"
| 58
| February 12
| @ Philadelphia
| 
| Michael Beasley (22)
| Enes Kanter (13)
| Hardaway Jr., Kanter (3)
| Wells Fargo Center20,589
| 23–35
|- style="background:#fcc;"
| 59
| February 14
| Washington
| 
| Tim Hardaway Jr. (37)
| Enes Kanter (14)
| Jarrett Jack (5)
| Madison Square Garden19,812
| 23–36
|- style="background:#cfc;"
| 60
| February 22
| @ Orlando
| 
| Trey Burke (26)
| Enes Kanter (12)
| Burke, Hardaway Jr. (6)
| Amway Center18,846
| 24–36
|- style="background:#fcc;"
| 61
| February 24
| Boston
| 
| Trey Burke (26)
| Enes Kanter (12)
| Trey Burke (8)
| Madison Square Garden19,812
| 24–37
|- style="background:#fcc;"
| 62
| February 26
| Golden State
| 
| Emmanuel Mudiay (20)
| Enes Kanter (7)
| Emmanuel Mudiay (7) 
| Madison Square Garden19,812
| 24–38

|- style="background:#fcc;"
| 63
| March 2
| @ LA Clippers
| 
| Enes Kanter (18)
| Enes Kanter (14)
| Emmanuel Mudiay (7)
| Staples Center17,190
| 24–39
|- style="background:#fcc;"
| 64
| March 4
| @ Sacramento
| 
| Tim Hardaway Jr. (24)
| Enes Kanter (16)
| Trey Burke (6)
| Golden 1 Center17,583
| 24–40
|- style="background:#fcc;"
| 65
| March 6
| @ Portland
| 
| Tim Hardaway Jr. (19)
| Enes Kanter (11)
| Trey Burke (7)
| Moda Center19,393
| 24–41
|- style="background:#fcc;"
| 66
| March 9
| @ Milwaukee
| 
| Tim Hardaway Jr. (26)
| Enes Kanter (8)
| Kyle O'Quinn (6)
| Bradley Center18,717
| 24–42
|- style="background:#fcc;"
| 67
| March 11
| Toronto
| 
| Tim Hardaway Jr. (25)
| Michael Beasley (11)
| Mudiay, O'Quinn (5)
| Madison Square Garden19,812
| 24–43
|- style="background:#fcc;"
| 68
| March 13
| Dallas
| 
| Michael Beasley (21)
| Enes Kanter (15)
| Frank Ntilikina (6)
| Madison Square Garden18,597
| 24–44
|- style="background:#fcc;"
| 69
| March 15
| Philadelphia
| 
| Michael Beasley (24)
| Michael Beasley (13)
| Michael Beasley (7)
| Madison Square Garden18,894
| 24–45
|- style="background:#cfc;"
| 70
| March 17
| Charlotte
| 
| Tim Hardaway Jr. (25)
| Enes Kanter (9)
| Trey Burke (5)
| Madison Square Garden17,760
| 25–45
|- style="background:#cfc;"
| 71
| March 19
| Chicago
| 
| Tim Hardaway Jr. (22)
| Enes Kanter (13)
| Burke, Ntilikina (5)
| Madison Square Garden18,835
| 26–45
|- style="background:#fcc;"
| 72
| March 21
| @ Miami
| 
| Enes Kanter (23)
| Enes Kanter (13)
| Emmanuel Mudiay (4)
| American Airlines Arena19,600
| 26–46
|- style="background:#fcc;"
| 73
| March 23
| Minnesota
| 
| Tim Hardaway Jr. (39)
| Enes Kanter (15)
| Trey Burke (9)
| Madison Square Garden18,914
| 26–47
|- style="background:#cfc;"
| 74
| March 25
| @ Washington
| 
| Trey Burke (19)
| Enes Kanter (11)
| Emmanuel Mudiay (7)
| Capital One Arena18,884
| 27–47
|- style="background:#fcc;"
| 75
| March 26
| @ Charlotte
| 
| Trey Burke (42)
| Enes Kanter (13)
| Trey Burke (12)
| Spectrum Center14,487
| 27–48
|- style="background:#fcc;"
| 76
| March 28
| @ Philadelphia
| 
| Beasley, Mudiay (22)
| Enes Kanter (14)
| Trey Burke (6)
| Wells Fargo Center20,655
| 27–49
|- style="background:#fcc;"
| 77
| March 31
| Detroit
| 
| Michael Beasley (32)
| Kyle O'Quinn (12)
| Trey Burke (15)
| Madison Square Garden19,812
| 27–50

|- style="background:#fcc;"
| 78
| April 3
| Orlando
| 
| Tim Hardaway Jr. (16)
| Kyle O'Quinn (12)
| Trey Burke (4)
| Madison Square Garden19,812
| 27–51
|- style="background:#cfc;"
| 79
| April 6
| Miami
| 
| Damyean Dotson (30)
| Kyle O'Quinn (14)
| Frank Ntilikina (9)
| Madison Square Garden19,569
| 28–51
|- style="background:#fcc;"
| 80
| April 7
| Milwaukee
| 
| Jarrett Jack (18)
| Kyle O'Quinn (16)
| Trey Burke (8)
| Madison Square Garden19,812
| 28–52
|- style="background:#fcc;"
| 81
| April 9
| Cleveland
| 
| Michael Beasley (20)
| Lance Thomas (7)
| Trey Burke (8)
| Madison Square Garden19,449
| 28–53
|- style="background:#cfc;"
| 82
| April 11
| @ Cleveland
| 
| Luke Kornet (23)
| Damyean Dotson (10)
| Trey Burke (9)
| Quicken Loans Arena20,562
| 29–53

Transactions

Trades

Free agency

Re-signed

Additions

Subtractions

References

New York Knicks seasons
New York Knicks
New York Knicks
New York Knicks
2010s in Manhattan
Madison Square Garden